The  were a Japanese jazz band and comedy group popular in film and television, particularly between the 1950s and 1970s. Led by Hajime Hana, the band's other main members were Kei Tani, Hitoshi Ueki, Hiroshi Inuzuka, Senri Sakurai, Shin Yasuda, and Ētarō Ishibashi.

Band origins
The band was originally formed in 1955 at the end of the first jazz boom in Japan under the name The Cuban Cats. Signed to Watanabe Productions, their performances mixed music and comedic bits, in the spirit of Frankie Sakai and the City Slickers, and they soon changed their name to the Crazy Cats. At the end of the 1950s, the main members were Hana, Tani, Ueki, Inuzuka, Yasuda, and Ishibashi. Sakurai joined in 1960, and Ishibashi left in 1971. 

The group became nationally famous after appearing on the television show "Otona No Manga" starting in 1959. Beginning in 1961, they co-starred on the variety show "Soap Bubble Holiday" ("Shabondama Horidē"), performing in skits written by Yukio Aoshima, who later became governor of Tokyo. Their 1961 song, "Sudara-Bushi," sung by Ueki, was a major hit and led to seven consecutive appearances on NHK's Kohaku Utagassen. Their popularity also led to a series of films produced at the Toho Studios, the most famous of which was the Musekinin Otoko or Irresponsible Man. The series of films featured Ueki as a salaryman attempting to advance up the corporate ladder.

Influence
In terms of their music, E. Taylor Atkins has said that "The Crazy Cats are significant for capitalizing and purveying an image of jazz musicians as clownish, slang-slinging ne’er-do-wells. Their audience rewarded the Cats with the longevity of which very few Japanese acts could boast." Mark Anderson has written that their "film series, in particular, had a great impact on 1960s popular culture," and that "they remain emblematic of a group of entertainers made possible by the television era."

Filmography 

 Nippon musekinin jidai (1962) Director: Kengo Furusawa
 Let's Meet in Our Dreams (1962) Director: Kengo Furusawa
 Strategy First Win (1963) Director: Seiji Hisamatsu
 Irresponsible Crushed! (1963) Director: Takashi Tsuboshima
 Crazy Cats Go to Hong Kong (1963) Director: Toshio Sugie 
 Irresponsible Yuden (1964)  Director: Toshio Sugie
Crazy Adventure (1965) Director: Kengo Furusawa
 It's A Strange Heaven (1966) Director: Takashi Tsuboshima
 Operation Crazy (1966) Director: Kengo Furusawa
 Industrial Spy Free for All (1967) Director: Takashi Tsuboshima
 Las Vegas Free-for-All (1967) Director: Takashi Tsuboshima 
 Monsieur Zivaco (1967) Director: Takashi Tsuboshima
 Mexican Free-for-All (1968) Director: Takashi Tsuboshima 
 The Great Discovery (1969) Director: Kengo Furusawa
 The Big Explosion (1969) Director: Kengo Furusawa 
 Be Deceived! (1971) Director: Takashi Tsuboshima

See also
 Hisaya Morishige
 The Drifters (Japanese band)

References

Musical groups established  in 1955
Musical groups disestablished in 2006
Japanese boy bands
Japanese jazz ensembles
Japanese comedy troupes
Male jazz musicians